The TF-2000-class destroyer is a projected anti-air warfare destroyer currently undergoing development by the Turkish Naval Institute. The class will provide survivability in the presence of aerial threat and also support mission functions such as command, control, and communications, reconnaissance, early warning, surface warfare, anti-submarine warfare and electronic warfare. On 5 December 2007, Defence Industry Executive Committee approved plans to build six ships of this class (4 fixed, 2 optional). In January 2013, it was announced that Turkey was planning to acquire a total of 8 TF-2000 destroyers, which was confirmed at the  International Defence Industry Fair (IDEF) 2021. With the realization of the project, it is intended to improve the anti-air warfare (AAW) capabilities of the Turkish Navy.

Description
At the moment, preliminary studies are conducted and configuration of the platform is being evaluated. The project necessitates high-level engineering and technology applications and also a long term realisation period with novel project management processes. Meanwhile, in-country development of the main sensor, multi-function Phased Array Radar is targeted to be achieved with the aim of maximum local content contribution, in close cooperation with universities, defense industry and national research institutions. With a similar project management approach implemented in the MILGEM project, the entire realisation period of the TF-2000 project also purposes to nurture the in-country technology and engineering applications as well as the nationalisation of the critical systems for the national defence industry. In February 2011, the feasibility studies of the submitted RFI documents were completed, stepping forward to the development of a project model.

Armament
On March 23–25, 2009, the Undersecretary of Turkish Defence Industries, Murad Bayar, held talks with SAAB Bofors Dynamics of Sweden and Kongsberg Defence & Aerospace of Norway for the production of RBS15 Mk.III/IV and Naval Strike Missile surface-to-surface missile systems in Turkey, to be used on the TF-2000 and MILGEM project warships of the Turkish Navy.

In the beginning of the project, it was thought that the ships would possess Mk 41 vertical launcher with 32 cells that fires SM-2 Standard and RIM-162 ESSM anti-air missiles. However, during the development phase the number of VLS cells was increased to 64 and replacing the Mk 41 system which the indigenous MILDAS VLS system.

The ship is expected to have a 127 mm gun, anti-ship missiles and anti-submarine warfare torpedoes with a storage area that can store two helicopters.

Missiles under evaluation
Atmaca (SSM)
RIM-156 SM-2 Block IV (SAM)
RIM-162 Evolved Sea Sparrow Missile (SAM)
RIM-116 Rolling Airframe Missile (CIWS-PDMS)
VL ASROC (ASW)
ROKETSAN Gezgin Land Attack (Cruise) Missile
G-40 Surface To Air Missile 
Naval version of Hisar-U with extended range
Aselsan STAMP
Electromagnetic Railgun or 127 mm Naval Gun

Countermeasures under evaluation
Directed Energy Weapons 
Directional Infrared Counter Measures

Sensors under evaluation
 ASELSAN ÇAFRAD ÇFR (Çok Fonksiyonlu Radar) / (Multi-function radar)
 ASELSAN ÇAFRAD AYR (Aydınlatma Radarı) / (Illumination/fire-control radar)
 ASELSAN ÇAFRAD UMR (Uzun Menzilli Radar) / (Long range radar)
 ASELSAN ÇAFRAD IFF (Elektronik Taramalı IFF)

Aircraft
Sikorsky S-70B Seahawk
Unmanned Aerial Vehicle

See also
 Guided missile frigate
 Anti-air warfare

References

External links
 Turkish Navy R&D Projects*
 Turkish Navy Official Website
 Bosphorus Naval News

Tf2000 Class Destroyer
Tf2000 Class Destroyer
Destroyer classes